The Most Beautiful Girl in the World may refer to:
"The Most Beautiful Girl in the World" (1935 song), 1935 song by Rodgers and Hart
"The Most Beautiful Girl in the World" (Prince song), 1994 song by Prince
The Most Beautiful Girl in the World (film), 2018 German film
"The Most Beautiful Girl", 1973 song written by Wilson, Sherrill and Rourke, and recorded by Charlie Rich